Welded sculpture (related to visual art and works of art) is an art form in which sculpture is made using welding techniques.

History

The Catalan artist Julio González is credited as one of the earliest developers of welded sculpture. González came from a line of metalsmith workers; his grandfather was a goldsmith in Galicia, who established in the Catalan capital in the early 19th century. González's father, Concordio González, owned a workshop and as a young boy, González learned from him the techniques of gold, silver, and iron metalwork. He is associated with the Spanish circle of artists of Montmartre, including Pablo Gargallo, Juan Gris and Max Jacob. In 1918, he developed an interest in the artistic possibilities of welding, after learning the technique whilst working in the Renault Factory at Boulogne-Billancourt. This technique would subsequently become his principal contribution to sculpture, though during this period he also painted and —especially— created jewellery pieces. In 1920 he renewed his acquaintance with Pablo Picasso, for whom he later provided technical assistance in executing sculptures in iron, participating to Picasso's researches on analytic cubism. He also forged the infrastructures of Constantin Brâncuși's plasters. In the winter of 1927-28, he showed Picasso how to use oxy-fuel welding and cutting. When their friendship re-established itself, Picasso and González collaborated on a piece called Woman in the Garden between 1928-1930. From October 1928 till 1932, both men worked together. Influenced by Picasso, the fifty-year-old González changed his style, exchanging bronze for iron, and volumes for lines. González began to formalize a new visual language in sculpture that would change the course of his career.

Welding was increasingly used in sculpture from the 1930s as new industrial processes such as arc welding were adapted to aesthetic purposes. Welding techniques, including digital cutting, can be used to cut and join metal. Welded sculptures are sometimes site-specific. Artist Richard Hunt said "The idea of exploiting welding methods and the tensile strength of metals opened up many possibilities to me. This idea was actually linked to the increasing recognition among artists that an art which was representative of our own time ought to use materials and techniques that were at hand, whether it was new experiments using plastics, new kinds of paints, new kinds of surfaces in painting, or using materials developed during the war effort.""

Associated artists
 Aleš Veselý
 Alexander Calder
 Andrew French
 Anthony Caro
 Antoine Pevsner
 Beverly Pepper
 Bruce Gray
 Charles Ginnever
 David Smith
 James Rosati
 John Raymond Henry
 Julio González
 Ken Macklin
 Kevin Caron
 Lyman Kipp
 Nancy Graves
 Pablo Gargallo
 Pablo Picasso
 Peter Hide
 Peter Reginato
 Revs
 Richard Serra
 Richard Hunt
 Robert H. Hudson
 Robert Willms
 Royden Mills
 Ryan McCourt
 Tim Scott
 TEJN
 Todor Todorov
 Vera Mukhina

External links
  Richard Hunt: Freeing the Human Soul
  Janet Goldner: Welded Steel Sculpture

Notes and references

Further reading
Creating Welded Sculpture, by Nathan Cabot Hale, Courier Dover Publications, 1994
Welded Sculpture of the Twentieth Century, Judy K.Van Wagner Collischan, Lund Humphries, 2000

Sculptures by medium
Welding